Patrick Kilpatrick (born August 20, 1949), is an American actor, director, screenwriter, producer, journalist, international entertainment speaker and teacher. He has appeared in over 180 films and television series.

Kilpatrick ran for Governor of California in the 2021 recall election as a Democrat.

Early life
Kilpatrick was born in Orange, Virginia, the son of Robert Donald Kilpatrick Sr. and Ellie Faye (born Ellwood Fay) Hines Kilpatrick. His ancestors are Scottish, Scots-Irish, a bit of Welsh, and English, having come to the U.S. as early as 1620, and he has relatives who fought in both the American Revolution and for the Confederacy in the Civil War. His father was a World War II "Beach Jumper", a predecessor to the modern U.S. Navy Seals, who received a Silver Star and Purple Heart in the Pacific and was a winner of the National Collegiate Baseball Championship for the University of Richmond.

When Kilpatrick was six, the family moved to Connecticut from Virginia, where his father (formerly a teacher) began his career in insurance underwriting. Kilpatrick Sr. was head of Connecticut General, and was a key figure in the merger that created the Cigna Corporation; he died on January 27, 1997, at age 72. His mother was a public school educator, coach, councilor and psychologist in private practice. The family bought property in Virginia in 1980. After nearly dying in a car crash at the age of 17 on November 17, 1967, he was rehabilitated to the point where he could later perform his own stunts.

Kilpatrick graduated from the University of Richmond in 1972 with a Bachelor of Arts degree in English, History, and Teaching and attended New York University's Professional Film and Television Graduate Program.

Career

Film and television 
Kilpatrick's entertainment career has spanned more than 180 films and television shows as lead actor, producer, screenwriter, director and acting coach/entertainment teacher. Most commonly playing the role of a villain, Kilpatrick has joked, "I’ve been killed, beaten-up or jailed by nearly every leading actor on earth and in outer space."

His action-film villain appearances include Showdown (1993), The Replacement Killers  (1998), Eraser (1996), Last Man Standing (1996), Minority Report (2002), Under Siege 2: Dark Territory (1995), Death Warrant (film) (1990),The Presidio (1988), and two Westerns opposite Tom Selleck, Last Stand at Saber River (1997)  and Crossfire Trail (2001). Kilpatrick also starred in Free Willy 3: The Rescue (1997).

In one 18-month period Kilpatrick, reportedly acted in five major-studio films and two independent films while making 27 television guest-star spots on 18 different shows. Other appearances include films such as Remo Williams: The Adventure Begins (1985); 3 Ninjas Knuckle Up (1995), and the PBS miniseries American Playhouse: Roanoak (1981), which became the largest production in the history of PBS.

Television appearances include Dark Angel; Lois & Clark: The New Adventures of Superman (1994); Walker, Texas Ranger (1994); Babylon 5 (1995); Dr. Quinn, Medicine Woman as Sergeant O'Connor for 9 episodes from 1996 to 1997; ER (1997); JAG (1997 & 2000); The X-Files (2001); General Hospital (2003); CSI: Crime Scene Investigation (2005); 24 (2005); Terminator: The Sarah Connor Chronicles (2008) and Chuck ("Chuck Versus the Gravitron"). He guess-starred in the Star Trek: Voyager episodes "Initiations" (1995) and "Drive" (2000) and in the Star Trek: Deep Space Nine episode "The Siege of AR-558" (1998). In January 2019, he began filming Catalyst (scheduled for 2021 release).

Stage 

Kilpatrick had a theatrical run at Los Angeles Theater Center for Shakespeare's Antony and Cleopatra, acted Off-Broadway in Hanoi Hilton at the Harold Clurman Theater (1984), Linda Her and The Fairy Garden (1984) at the Second Stage, and in regional theater, Requiem for a Heavyweight (1985).

He has directed Off-Broadway and was a founding member of Divine Theater in New York City. His play, Zone of Bells/Room of Seesaws,  premiered at the 1984 East Village Arts Festival. He was assistant director on Broadway with The Golden Age (1984) and Entertaining Mr. Sloane, (1984, Cherry Lane Theatre), and on Death Trap (1984) in the West End of London.

Author 

In 2018, Kilpatrick released a memoir, Dying for living: Sins & Confessions of a Hollywood Villain & Libertine Patriot Vol. 1 – Upbringing, published by Boulevard Books (NYC) on October 1, 2018, launched October 3, 2018 at National Press Club and Kennedy Center for Performing Arts. The book received the "Best of LA" Award 2018 with 5-star reviews. 

Kilpatrick's follow-up, Dying for living: Wasted Talent in the Valley of Debacle (Vol. 2 - Showbiz), was set for publication at the end of 2019.

2021 California gubernatorial recall election 
In July 2021, Kilpatrick announced that he was running as a candidate in the 2021 California gubernatorial recall election as one of nine Democrats attempting to recall California's governor, Gavin Newsom. The 50% threshold to recall Newsom was not reached, and Kilpatrick received 1.2% of the replacement candidate vote.

Awards and nominations

References

External links
 

1949 births
American male film actors
American male stage actors
American male television actors
Candidates in the 2021 United States elections
Living people
American people of English descent
American people of Irish descent
American people of Scottish descent
American people of Welsh descent
Male actors from Virginia
People from Orange, Virginia
People from Chaves County, New Mexico